January 15 - Eastern Orthodox liturgical calendar - January 17

All fixed commemorations below are observed on January 29 by Eastern Orthodox Churches on the Old Calendar.

For January 16th, Orthodox Churches on the Old Calendar commemorate the Saints listed on January 3.

Saints
 Martyrs Speusippus, Eleusippus and Melapsippus, Cappadocian triplets, and their grandmother Leonilla, and with them Neon, Turbo, and Jonilla ( Jovilla), in Cappadocia (c. 161-180)
 Martyr Danax the Reader, of Avlona in Illyria (2nd century)  (see also: January 15)

Pre-Schism Western saints
 Saint Priscilla, of the Roman Glabrio family, who hosted St. Peter circa AD 42 (1st century)
 Pope Marcellus I, Pope of Rome from 308 to 309, suffered for confessing the faith (309)  (see also: June 7 in the East)
 Venerable Honoratus of Arles, Archbishop of Arles and founder of Lerins Monastery (429)
 Saint James of Tarentaise, first Bishop of Tarentaise (429)
 Saint Valerius, Bishop of Sorrento (c. 453)
 Saint Liberata, sister of St Epiphanius of Pavia in Italy and St Honorata (5th century)
 Saint Honoratus of Fondi, founder of the monastery of Fondi in Italy (6th century)
 Saint Triverius (Trevor), hermit (550)
 Saint Fulgentius of Cartagena, Bishop of Cartagena and Ecija (Astigi), in Hispania (633)
 Martyr Sigeberht of East Anglia, King of the East Angles (635)  (see also: January 25.)
 Saint Fursey, Irish missionary monk of Burgh Castle (East Anglia), Lagny, and Peronne (Gaul) (650)
 Saint Titian of Oderzo, for thirty years a Bishop near Venice in Italy (650)
 Saint Ferréol of Grenoble (Ferreolus, Fergéol), Bishop of Grenoble (c. 670)
 Saint Dunchaid O'Braoin (Dúnchad ua Bráein), Abbot of Clonmacnoise (988)

Post-Schism Orthodox saints
 Saint Romilus the Sinaite, the Hesychast of Ravenica, monk of Mount Athos and disciple of St. Gregory of Sinai, and with him Saints Nestor, Martinius, Daniel, Sisoes, Zosimas, and Gregory (1375)
 Blessed Maximus of Totma in Vologda, Fool-for-Christ and Wonderworker (1650)
 Saint Gerasimus II (Palladas) of Alexandria, Patriarch of Alexandria (1714)
 New Hieromartyr Damascene of Gabrovo, Hieromonk of Hilandar on Mount Athos, at Svishtovo (1771)
 New Hieromartyr Nicholas of Mytilene, Priest (1777)

New martyrs and confessors
 New Hieromartyr John, Priest (1919)

Other commemorations
 Veneration of the Precious Chains of the holy and all-glorious Apostle Peter (Liberation of Saint Peter).
 Repose of Elder Theodore of Irkutsk (1923)
 Repose of Priest Demetrius Gagastathis of Platanos, Trikala (1975)

Icon gallery

Notes

References

Sources
 January 16/January 29. Orthodox Calendar (PRAVOSLAVIE.RU).
 January 29 / January 16. HOLY TRINITY RUSSIAN ORTHODOX CHURCH (A parish of the Patriarchate of Moscow).
 January 16. OCA - The Lives of the Saints.
 The Autonomous Orthodox Metropolia of Western Europe and the Americas (ROCOR). St. Hilarion Calendar of Saints for the year of our Lord 2004. St. Hilarion Press (Austin, TX). p. 8.
 January 16. Latin Saints of the Orthodox Patriarchate of Rome.
 The Roman Martyrology. Transl. by the Archbishop of Baltimore. Last Edition, According to the Copy Printed at Rome in 1914. Revised Edition, with the Imprimatur of His Eminence Cardinal Gibbons. Baltimore: John Murphy Company, 1916. pp. 16–17.
Greek Sources
 Great Synaxaristes:  16 ΙΑΝΟΥΑΡΙΟΥ. ΜΕΓΑΣ ΣΥΝΑΞΑΡΙΣΤΗΣ.
  Συναξαριστής. 16 Ιανουαρίου. ECCLESIA.GR. (H ΕΚΚΛΗΣΙΑ ΤΗΣ ΕΛΛΑΔΟΣ). 
Russian Sources
  29 января (16 января). Православная Энциклопедия под редакцией Патриарха Московского и всея Руси Кирилла (электронная версия). (Orthodox Encyclopedia - Pravenc.ru).
  16 января (ст.ст.) 29 января 2013 (нов. ст.). Русская Православная Церковь Отдел внешних церковных связей. (DECR).

January in the Eastern Orthodox calendar